Ricky Earl Price (born September 16, 1987) is a former American football safety. He was signed by the Chiefs as an undrafted free agent in 2009 and played for the Chiefs in the 2009 and 2010 season. He played college football at Oklahoma State.

Early years
Price attended Cypress Falls High School in Houston, graduated in 2005.

College career
Price attended Oklahoma State University, where he played wide receiver for his first two seasons, and became a full-time starter at safety his junior and senior years.

Professional career

Kansas City Chiefs
The Kansas City Chiefs signed Price to their practice squad on October 28, 2009. He was promoted to the active roster on December 26 after safety DaJuan Morgan was placed on injured reserve. Price spent the majority of the 2010 season on the practice squad before being activated in December. Price was waived on September 3, 2014 during the final roster cutdowns.

External links
Kansas City Chiefs bio

References

1987 births
Living people
Players of American football from Houston
American football wide receivers
American football safeties
Oklahoma State Cowboys football players
Kansas City Chiefs players